Labiobarbus cyanopareja is a freshwater fish of the family Cyprinidae endemic to the Philippines. This species is of doubtful validity and some authorities consider that L. cyanopareja is a junior synonym of Osteochilus vittatus.

References

 

cyanopareja
Cyprinid fish of Asia
Taxa named by Johann Jakob Heckel
Fish described in 1843